Anand Isher Senior Secondary Public School, also known as: AISSPS, is an educational institute located in the outskirts of Mandi Ahmedgarh, Sangrur district, Punjab, India.
The school is noted for its strong academic foundations, encouragement of co-curricular and extracurricular activities. The principal of the school is Dr. J.S. Riar. The director is Mr. Kartar Singh and administrator is Dr. Jagbir Kaur Grewal. The Vice-Principal is Mr. Chandrashekar and Primary wing headmistress is Ms. Chandrakala Pant.

Initiation

An affiliate of the Central Board of Secondary Education, New Delhi, Anand Isher Senior Secondary Public School was established in 1979  by Sant Baba Amar Singh Ji and later conducted by a trust called the Nanaksar Thath Isher Darbar Trust. The school got its name after two distinguished saints from Nanaksar - Sant Baba Nand Singh Ji and Sant Baba Isher Singh Ji. An English medium school from class nursery to XII standard, it has 2,000 students from 75 different villages, towns and cities.

Academic Standard

In 2005, the school launched a new wing for a primary school, the ceremony being inaugurated by the chief founder Sant Baba Amar Singh Ji. The new wing would accommodate an extra 1200 students in primary and secondary level. The school maintains relations with the Guru Nanak School, Hayes, Middlesex, England and has patterned its curriculum as per that school's standard.

References

High schools and secondary schools in Punjab, India
Education in Sangrur
1979 establishments in Punjab, India
Educational institutions established in 1979